Salthill Devon Football Club is an Irish association football club originally based in Salthill, Galway. Their senior team currently plays in the Galway & District League. They have previously played in the Connacht Senior League, the A Championship and the League of Ireland First Division. In 2012 they played under the name SD Galway. Since 2005 Salthill Devon have hosted a youth tournament known as the Galway Cup.

History

Early years
Salthill Devon F.C. was founded in 1947 as Salthill Crusaders. In 1950 they became Salthill Athletic. In 1977 Salthill Athletic merged with Devon Celtic to become Salthill Devon.

Connacht Senior League
Between 1981 and 2000 Salthill Devon played in the Connacht Senior League. In 1981–82, together  with Sligo Rovers Reserves, Castlerea Celtic, Mervue United,  Ballina Rovers, Tuam Celtic and UCG, Salthill Devon became founder members of the CSL. While playing in the CSL, Salthill Devon won both the Connacht Senior Cup and the Connacht Senior League Challenge Cup on three occasions. Between 1989–90 and 1991–92 they won the Senior Cup three times in row. In 1989–90 and 1991–92 they won both cups in the same season. After finishing as runners-up on three occasions, Salthill Devon finally won the league title in 1990–91. They also completed a double by winning the Senior Cup. In 1991–92 Salthill Devon became the first CSL champions to represent the league in the League of Ireland Cup.

National leagues
During the early 2000s Salthill Devon entered a team in the League of Ireland U21 Division. In 2006 they became the first club to win the division championship, the Dr Tony O'Neill Cup, without having a team in the senior League of Ireland divisions. In 2008, together with local rivals, Mervue United, Salthill Devon, were founder members of the A Championship. In 2008 they finished bottom of their group but 2009 saw a complete reversal as they comfortably won their group. Salthill narrowly lost out in the A Championship play off final against Shamrock Rovers A but as the highest placed non-reserve team, they qualified for a promotion/relegation play-off against Kildare County. However, after Kildare County withdrew from the League of Ireland First Division, Salthill Devon won promotion without evening kicking a ball. Between 2010 and 2013, Salthill Devon finished bottom of the table three seasons in a row. In their inaugural season Salthill Devon avoided relegation by defeating Cobh Ramblers home and away in the First Division Play Off. Subsequently they avoided relegation because the A Championship was disbanded. Following the withdrawal of Galway United from the League of Ireland after the 2011 season, Salthill Devon re-branded themselves as SD Galway for the 2012 season. They adopted the maroon and white worn by Galway United and switched their home matches from Drom Soccer Park to Terryland Park.

Galway United
In 2012 an FAI commissioned report recommended that Galway city and County Galway should be represented in the League of Ireland by a single club or team based at Eamonn Deacy Park. The O'Connor Report also recommended that the Galway Football Association, the Galway United Supporters Trust, Mervue United and Salthill Devon should work together to form such a club. Following the conclusion of the 2013 season, both Mervue United and Salthill Devon withdrew from the League of Ireland First Division to make way for a reformed Galway United. The new board of Galway United featured two Salthill Devon representatives, Jim McSpadden and Ollie Daniels. In advance of the 2014 League of Ireland First Division season eight former Salthill Devon players, including Vinny Faherty, also signed for the reformed Galway club. The O'Connor Report had also recommended reforming the Connacht Senior League, allowing  Mervue United and Salthill Devon to play at a provincial level.
However, in June 2013 the Connacht Tribune reported that the plans for a reformed CSL were shelved due to a lack of sufficient interest from the clubs. The senior teams of Mervue United and Salthill Devon subsequently joined the Galway & District League.

Ground
Salthill Devon F.C. play their home games at Drom Soccer Park. During their time in the League of Ireland First Division they also played some games at Terryland Park, most notably during the 2012 season when they played as SD Galway.

Notable former players
Republic of Ireland men's international

Republic of Ireland women's internationals

Republic of Ireland U21 internationals
  Colin Hawkins
  Joe Shaughnessy
Republic of Ireland U19 internationals
  John Russell
 Other internationals
  Wesley Charles

Honours
A Championship
Runners Up: 2009 : 1
Connacht Senior League
Winners: 1990–91: 1
Runners Up: 1983–84, 1988–89, 1989–90 : 3
Connacht Senior Cup
Winners: 1989–90, 1990–91, 1991–92, 2009–10: 4
Runners Up: 1996–97: 1
Connacht Senior League Challenge Cup
Winners: 1985–86, 1989–90, 1991–92, : 3
Runners Up: 1990–91, 1995–96, 1999–2000: 3
Michael Byrne Cup
Winners: 2015: 1
FAI Youth Cup
Runners Up: 1994–95, 2008–09: 2
Dr Tony O'Neill Cup:
Winners: 2005–06: 1
Runners Up: 2009: 1

References

 
1947 establishments in Ireland
A Championship teams
Association football clubs established in 1947
Association football clubs in County Galway
Association football clubs in Galway (city)
Connacht Senior League (association football) clubs
Former League of Ireland clubs
Former League of Ireland First Division clubs
Galway & District League teams
Galway United F.C.
Devon Football Club